Leslie George "Jiver" Hutchinson (6 March 1906 – 22 November 1959) was a Jamaican jazz trumpeter and bandleader. 
Hutchinson played in the band of Bertie King in Jamaica in the 1930s, then moved to England, where he played with Happy Blake's Cuba Club Band. In 1936, he played in Leslie Thompson's Emperors of Jazz and in 1938 with Ken "Snakehips" Johnson, then joined Geraldo's band in 1939. He led his own ensemble from 1944 to 1950, featuring many of the musicians from Thompson's band. His ensemble toured the UK and Europe, and did concerts in India in 1945. He also recorded with the ensemble in 1947. He returned to play with Geraldo after the group's dissolution, and recorded with Mary Lou Williams in 1952.

Hutchinson was killed in a car crash in Weeting, Norfolk in 1959 aged 53 while on tour with his band. His daughter is the singer Elaine Delmar.

References

Other sources
Howard Rye & John Cowley, "Jiver Hutchinson". Grove Jazz online.

1906 births
1959 deaths
Jamaican jazz trumpeters
20th-century trumpeters
Road incident deaths in England